Vintage Television (VTV) (officially known as Vintage Enterprises, Inc. and mostly known as Vintage Sports) was a Philippine media company and was best known as the TV coverage partner of Philippine Basketball Association from 1982 to 1999. It was acquired by Philippine media giant Viva Entertainment in late 1999. It was also famed for its weekly boxing show called Blow by Blow during the 1990s, which began the popularity of professional boxer eight-division world champion Manny Pacquiao.

History
In 1978, Vintage Enterprises was founded by the brothers Carlos "Bobong" Vélez and Ricky Vélez. Its first major program was the coverage of the Philippine Basketball Association games in 1982. The games were initially aired at City2 Television from 1982 to 1983, then transferred to the Maharlika Broadcasting System in 1984. Other shows like Blow by Blow and Hot Stuff began airing in 1994. Aside from producing sports coverages, Vintage Television had acquired foreign entertainment programming such as Japanese tokusatsu and anime series.

Vintage Enterprises transferred to the Intercontinental Broadcasting Corporation in 1996. It was renamed Vintage Television in 1998 and produced more programs for IBC. The company was acquired by media giant Viva Entertainment in 1999 following the effects of the 1997 Asian financial crisis, making the Velez group being part of the Viva Entertainment group with Viva as surviving entity, In 2000, Vintage Television was renamed as Viva TV as the primetime sports and entertainment block on IBC, at this time it also known as Viva-Vintage until 2003.

TV partners
City2 Television (1982–1983)
Maharlika Broadcasting System / People's Television Network (1984–1995)
Intercontinental Broadcasting Corporation (1996–1999)
ESPN Philippines (1997–1999)

See also
Viva Television

References

Television channels and stations established in 1982
Philippine Basketball Association mass media
National Basketball Association on television
Television in the Philippines
Mass media in Metro Manila
Television in Metro Manila
People's Television Network
Intercontinental Broadcasting Corporation
Television channels and stations disestablished in 1999
Viva Entertainment
Philippine companies established in 1982